Kazansky railway terminal (Kazansky vokzal) also known as Moscow Kazansky railway station (Moskva-Kazanskaya) is one of nine railway terminals in Moscow, situated on the Komsomolskaya Square, across the square from the Leningradsky and Yaroslavsky stations.

Kazansky station primarily serves two major railway lines radiating from Moscow: the eastbound one, to Kazan, Yekaterinburg, and points beyond (one of the routes of the Trans-Siberian Railway), and the south-east-bound one, to Ryazan. After Ryazan, the south-eastern line branches a number of times, so that trains originating from Kazansky station serve most of south-eastern Russia, Kazakhstan, and the post-Soviet Central Asian states (mostly via the Trans-Aral line). Commuter trains serving these two directions use Kazansky station as well.

Occasionally, long-distance trains serving the eastbound Moscow-Nizhny Novgorod line use Kazansky station as well. However, the commuter trains of that line never do so, as they always arrive to Moscow's Kursky Rail Terminal.

The forerunner of today's Kazan railway station was built in 1862 with the opening of the railway line from Moscow to Ryazan. Construction of the modern building according to the design by architect Alexey Shchusev started in 1913 and ended in 1940. The building resembles the Söyembikä Tower in Kazan.

Trains and destinations

Long distance

Other destinations

Suburban destinations
Suburban commuter trains (elektrichka) connect Kazansky station with the towns of Lyubertsy, Zhukovsky, Gzhel, Kurovskoye, Shatura, Cherusti, Vekovka, Bykovo, Ramenskoye, Bronnitsy, Voskresensk, Yegoryevsk, Kolomna and Ryazan.

Gallery

References

External links

Kazansky Rail Terminal Official site 
Russian Railways (Российские Железные Дороги) 
Kazkhstan Railways (Қазақстан темір жолы) 
Uzbekistan Railways (O'zbekiston temir yo'llari) 
Uzbekistan Railways UzRailPass 
Kyrgyzstan Railways (Кыргыз Темир Жолу) 
Virtual tour to Leningradsky, Yaroslavsky and Kazansky train station

Railway stations in the Russian Empire opened in 1864
Buildings and structures built in the Soviet Union
Railway stations in Moscow
Railway stations of Moscow Railway
Art Nouveau architecture in Moscow
Art Nouveau railway stations
Transport infrastructure completed in 1940
Cultural heritage monuments of federal significance in Moscow